Skin pop scars are a cutaneous condition caused by intravenous drug abuse.

See also 
 Skin track
 List of cutaneous conditions

References 

Scarring
Drugs